Minuscule 373 (in the Gregory-Aland numbering), ε 500 (Soden), is a Greek minuscule manuscript of the New Testament, on paper. Palaeographically it has been assigned to the 15th century. 
It has marginalia.

Description 

The codex contains the text of the four Gospels on 221 paper leaves with lacunae at the end of John. The text is written in one column per page, in 46 lines with text of commentary. The biblical text is surrounded by a catena.

The text is divided according to the Ammonian Sections (in Mark 241 Sections, the last in 16:20), whose numbers are given at the margin, but without references to the Eusebian Canons.

Text 

The Greek text of the codex is a representative of the Byzantine text-type. Aland placed it in Category V.

According to the Claremont Profile Method it represents textual family Kx in Luke 1, Luke 10, and Luke 20. It creates pair with 301.

History 

The manuscript formerly belonged to Cardinal Sirleti (1514-1585), who became a librarian of the Vatican Library. 
It was added to the list of New Testament manuscripts by Scholz (1794–1852). C. R. Gregory saw it in 1886.

The manuscript is currently housed at the Vatican Library (Vat. gr. 1423) in Rome.

See also 

 List of New Testament minuscules
 Biblical manuscript
 Textual criticism

References

Further reading 

 

Greek New Testament minuscules
15th-century biblical manuscripts
Manuscripts of the Vatican Library